Denys Serhiyovych Prychynenko (born 17 February 1992) is a professional footballer who plays as a centre-back for Belgian club Deinze. He previously played for Heart of Midlothian, Raith Rovers on loan, PFC Sevastopol, CSKA Sofia, Union Berlin, RWS Bruxelles and Beerschot. Born in Germany, he represents Ukraine internationally.

Youth career
Prychynenko was born on 17 February 1992 in Potsdam to a Ukrainian family. A pupil of the German football school.

Prychynenko played as an under-17 player for FC Energie Cottbus before joining Tennis Borussia Berlin in 2008. In 2009, he moved, joining Heart of Midlothian where he was a member of the successful under-19 squad who finished second behind Celtic during the 2010–11 Scottish Premier League under-19 season. He picked up the Hearts under 19 player of the season award and was their top scorer with 14 goals during season 2010–11.

Club career

Heart of Midlothian
Prychynenko joined the Heart of Midlothian first team on 26 February 2011 being named as a substitute against Aberdeen and on one further occasion. Due to injury he failed to make his debut that season despite that his under 19 form earned him a new three-year contract extending his stay until 2014. In November 2011 he joined Raith Rovers on loan until January 2012 to gain first team experience. On return from Raith, Denys made his first team début for Hearts as a late substitute in a Scottish Premier League match; a 3–0 win over Aberdeen. He was an unused substitute as Hearts won the 2012 Scottish Cup Final.

After making seven appearances for the club and having one more year left with the club, Prychyneko was released by the club, as Manager Gary Locke intended to reshape the squad.

Raith Rovers (loan)
On 3 November 2011, Prychynenko joined Scottish First Division side Raith Rovers on loan until 4 January 2012. Making his debut that weekend against Dundee at Dens Park. On 26 November, he was one of four on loan Jambos named in the starting line-up for the 3–2 victory over Hamilton Academical at Stark's Park. All three Raith goals were scored by on loan Hearts players as Prychynenko, Jason Holt and David Smith each netted their first professional goal. In all he made five appearances for the club, with his last appearance coming on 10 December against Livingston, due to requiring hernia surgery that limited his appearances. On 5 January 2012, Prychynenko's loan deal expired and he returned to Hearts.

Returning to Ukraine
After being released by Hearts, Prychychenko returned to Ukraine on 13 July 2013 by joining FC Sevastopol on a free transfer. In an interview with the Herald Scotland, he cited playing for Hearts as making him tougher player and talked about playing for a club in the Crimean war zone.

CSKA Sofia
On 17 July 2014, Prychynenko signed a one-year contract with the most successful club in Bulgaria, PFC CSKA Sofia. He made his debut 1 week after against Litex Lovech winning 1–0. After good performances in his first five games, Prychynenko signed a new three-year deal until 2017, on 2 September 2014.

Union Berlin
On 1 July 2015, Prychynenko signed a two-year contract with German 2. Bundesliga side 1. FC Union Berlin until 2017. He was released on 12 January 2016.

Royal White Star Brussels
End of February 2016, Prychynenko joined Belgian Second Division side Royal White Star Bruxelles, signing a contract until 2018 including an extension clause. He appeared in six games until the end of the season, achieving first place in the league with his team, which would usually lead to promotion to the Belgian first division. Bruxelles, however, didn't receive a license for professional football for the upcoming season and were relegated to the third tier.

Deinze
On 11 June 2021, he signed with Deinze as a free agent.

Personal life
Prychynenko was born in Potsdam, Germany, to Olena and Serhiy Prychynenko. His uncle Volodymyr Prychynenko and his cousin Stanislav Prychynenko (Volodymyr's son) are also professional footballers. Furthermore, Prychynenko holds a BA degree in business with marketing and is planning to start a law degree.

Prychynenko opposed the Euromaidan and expressed support in the annexation of Crimea by the Russian Federation.

Career statistics

References

External links

1992 births
Living people
Sportspeople from Potsdam
Footballers from Brandenburg
Ukrainian footballers
Ukraine youth international footballers
German footballers
German people of Ukrainian descent
Naturalized citizens of Ukraine
Association football midfielders
Scottish Football League players
Ukrainian Premier League players
First Professional Football League (Bulgaria) players
2. Bundesliga players
Belgian Pro League players
Challenger Pro League players
FC Energie Cottbus players
Tennis Borussia Berlin players
Heart of Midlothian F.C. players
Raith Rovers F.C. players
FC Sevastopol players
PFC CSKA Sofia players
1. FC Union Berlin players
RWS Bruxelles players
K Beerschot VA players
K.M.S.K. Deinze players
German expatriate footballers
Ukrainian expatriate footballers
Expatriate footballers in Scotland
Expatriate footballers in Bulgaria
Expatriate footballers in Germany
Expatriate footballers in Belgium
Ukrainian expatriate sportspeople in Scotland
Ukrainian expatriate sportspeople in Bulgaria
Ukrainian expatriate sportspeople in Belgium
Ukrainian expatriate sportspeople in Germany